Meerut division is one of the 18 administrative division of Uttar Pradesh state in India. Meerut city is the administrative headquarters of the division. It consists of six districts namely Baghpat, Bulandshahr, Gautam Buddha Nagar, Ghaziabad, Hapur and Meerut.

Coverage

It is that area of Western Uttar Pradesh which is part of National Capital Region (NCR). All the districts, major cities and towns in this division are part of the NCR region of Uttar Pradesh. Ghaziabad, Noida were first to be added to NCR, later Meerut, Hapur, Muzaffarnagar, Bulandshahr and Baghpat were added. The region consists of nearly 37% of NCR area.

Education
Higher government educational institutions in Meerut division are Chaudhary Charan Singh University  (Meerut), LLRM Medical College (Meerut) and Gautam Buddha University (Greater Noida).

Website
Division's official website is http://meerutdivision.nic.in/

 
Divisions of Uttar Pradesh